The flag of Marche is one of the official symbols of the region of Marche, Italy. Like many Italian regional flags, it was adopted on 4 November 1995 for Armed Forces Day of Italy (it). In absence of a law on the subject, the regional emblem that had been adopted on 15 March 1980 was simply inserted on a white background.

Symbolism
The emblem of Marche bears a stylized woodpecker, overlapping a black shape to form a capital letter M, against a green-bordered shield with a white field. The flag was designed by Maurizio Catani and Gianni Veroli.

The woodpecker was the tribal totem of the Picentes, an Italic tribe who lived in most of the territory of present-day Marche.

The bird's connection to the region is attested to in Greek and Roman literature:

History

Duchy of Urbino

The only historical evidence (around 1508) of the Duchy of Urbino flag is in a painting by Timoteo Viti stored at the Accademia di Brera in Milan. It appears to have two elongated tails. The background is golden yellow, the wheel located closer to the mast, essentially imitating the coat of arms of House of Montefeltro - blue and gold stripes, with a second stripe containing a black eagle, which has been the coat of arms of the city of Urbino for centuries.

Republic of Ancona

The flag of the republic, which appeared in the second half of the 12th century and survived until its annexation to the Papal State (1532). The imperial gift of Byzantium, as a reward for merit and loyalty to Manuel I Komnenos, mirrored the Byzantine insignia, devoid of B-shaped symbols in the cantons. In more recent times (1934), Ancona took over the ancient nautical insignia, placing them on its city symbols, but the cross is Greek.

March of Ancona

Following the loss of independence, Ancona entrusted its maritime tradition to the Pope and lowered its flag, replacing it with a simple red-yellow bicolor. Sometimes papal insignia were added.

Anconine Republic

The Anconine Republic was established in 1797 and existed as a provisional sister republic. The flag in use from the proclamation of independence on 19 November 1797 until the union with the Roman Republic on 7 March 1798. It was intended for general use, but for the merchant fleet it was preferred to pick up the French tricolor. Yellow and red referred to the historic maritime republic. Blue has been added in tribute to France.

Gallery

References

Flags of regions of Italy
Culture in le Marche
Flags introduced in 1995